Săvădisla is a commune in Cluj County, Transylvania, Romania. It is composed of eight villages: Finișel, Hășdate, Lita, Liteni, Săvădisla, Stolna, Vălișoara and Vlaha.

Demographics 
At the 2011 census, 51.6% of inhabitants were Hungarians, 44.4% Romanians and 1.8% Roma.

The commune's villages are:

 Until 1889 Olahfenes.

Archaeology 
A necropolis has been discovered at Vlaha, being one of the very few Gepid sites in Transylvania.

References 

 Atlasul localităților județului Cluj (Cluj County Localities Atlas), Suncart Publishing House, Cluj-Napoca,

External links 
 The archaeological site at Vlaha 

Communes in Cluj County
Localities in Transylvania
Archaeological sites in Romania